Group A of the 2015 Copa América was one of the three groups of competing nations in the 2015 Copa América. It consisted of hosts Chile, guests Mexico of CONCACAF, Ecuador, and Bolivia. Group play began on 11 June 2015 and ended on 19 June 2015.

Chile and Bolivia advanced to the quarter-finals.

Teams

Notes

Standings

In the quarter-finals:
Chile advanced to play Uruguay (third-placed team of Group B).
Bolivia advanced to play Peru (runners-up of Group C).

Matches
All times local, CLT (UTC−3).

Chile vs Ecuador

Mexico vs Bolivia

Ecuador vs Bolivia

Chile vs Mexico

Mexico vs Ecuador

Chile vs Bolivia

References

External links
 (Official website) 
Copa América 2015, CONMEBOL.com 

Group
2014–15 in Mexican football
2015 in Ecuadorian football
2014–15 in Bolivian football
Group